Cordicollis is a genus of beetles belonging to the family Anthicidae.

The species of this genus are found in Europe, Southern Asia and Madagascar.

Species:
 Cordicollis gracilior (Abeille de Perrin, 1885) 
 Cordicollis gracilis (Panzer, 1796)

References

Anthicidae